High Tech High School is a full-time public magnet high school serving students in ninth through twelfth grades in Secaucus, in Hudson County, New Jersey, United States, operating as part of the Hudson County Schools of Technology. Since its establishment in 1991, High Tech High School has been named a Top Ten High School, a Governor's School of Excellence, a New Jersey Star School (twice) and has been cited by New Jersey Monthly magazine as one of the state's great public high schools. The school is noted for success in the sciences and in the performing arts, winning several awards in both fields.

As of the 2021–22 school year, the school had an enrollment of 1,008 students and 91.8 classroom teachers (on an FTE basis), for a student–teacher ratio of 11.0:1. There were 238 students (23.6% of enrollment) eligible for free lunch and 90 (8.9% of students) eligible for reduced-cost lunch.

History
High Tech High School was founded in 1991 by the Hudson County Schools of Technology school district to provide Hudson County residents with a quality public education in a technology-based environment, beginning with a class of 30 students when it opened. The school has grown to more than 1,000 students and has been able to maintain a student-to-faculty ratio of 12 to 1.

In September 2018, the school moved from its previous location in North Bergen to a newly built  school building constructed at a cost of $160 million on a  site in Secaucus. The former building was sold to North Bergen school district to become the new home of North Bergen High School.

Awards, recognition, and rankings
Awards received by High Tech High School include:
Business Insider, using data from the 2015 Niche rankings, ranked High Tech High School 21st on its 2014 list of the "25 best public high school in the United States".
In September 2013, the school was one of 15 in New Jersey to be recognized by the United States Department of Education as part of the National Blue Ribbon Schools Program, an award called the "most prestigious honor in the United States' education system" and which Education Secretary Arne Duncan described as schools that "represent examples of educational excellence".
In its 2013 report on "America's Best High Schools", The Daily Beast ranked the school 436th in the nation among participating public high schools and 36th among schools in New Jersey.
Schooldigger.com ranked the school tied for 29th out of 381 public high schools statewide in its 2011 rankings (a decrease of 10 positions from the 2010 ranking) which were based on the combined percentage of students classified as proficient or above proficient on the mathematics (92.3%) and language arts literacy (100.0%) components of the High School Proficiency Assessment (HSPA).
 In the 2011 "Ranking America's High Schools" issue by The Washington Post, the school was ranked 49th in New Jersey and 1,516th nationwide.
 2003 Governor's School of Excellence
 2002 School Leader Award, NJ School Boards Association
 2001 Best High School Musical, Director, Costumes - Paper Mill Playhouse
 2000 2000 National Student Community Service Award - SkillsUSA
 1999 100 Top Wired Schools in the US by FamilyPC Magazine
 1998 New Jersey Star School by NJ Department of Education.
 1997 Flagship School for Exemplary Video Journalism by Channel One
 1996 Best Practices in World Languages by the New Jersey Department of Education
 1995 New Jersey Star School by New Jersey Department of Education.
 1995 10 Best Overall Schools in New Jersey by New Jersey Monthly Magazine
 1994 Philanthropic Corporate Award by Panasonic, Matsushita
 1993 Outstanding Program Award by NJASCD
 1992 School Leadership Exemplary Program Award by NJSBA
 1992 NJ State National Blue Ribbon Nominee, New Jersey Department of Education
 1992 School Leader Award Competition, NJ School Boards' Association
 1991 Model Parental Involvement Program Award by NJSBA

Demographics
Hudson County is the smallest of New Jersey's 21 counties. Highly urbanized and densely populated, the 2000 census ranked this area as fourth in the nation on the ethnicity index. As a regional magnet school, High Tech draws on its diverse student population from the 12 towns and cities within the county.  The average expenditure per student is $14,760 and is derived from federal, state, and county aid. High Tech High School is accredited by the New Jersey Department of Education. 43% of the student body is Hispanic, 32% is Caucasian, 16% is Asian/Pacific Islander, and 9% is African American.

Sports
The High Tech Lasercats had competed in the Hudson County Interscholastic Athletic Association (HCIAA), which includes public and private high schools in Hudson County. The league operates under the supervision of the New Jersey State Interscholastic Athletic Association (NJSIAA).

High Tech had few sports teams, including girls' and boys' tennis, bowling, a judo club and basketball. Their best was their soccer team, which had a five-year run of county championships (2004-2008).

The girls' softball team won the 2008 North I, Group II state sectional championship, defeating Hoboken High School 3–1 in the tournament final. The team won the first round of the Group I state championship with a 4–2 win over Pompton Lakes High School 4–2, before falling to Pennsville Memorial High School by a score of 8–2 in the final game.

In March 2010, mayors from all 12 municipalities in Hudson County signed a petition stating that High Tech High School and County Prep High School should eliminate their sports programs because of budget cuts. On April 22, 2010; it was revealed in the new budget that sports were cut from both schools for the 2010–11 school year. The students attending High Tech High School at the time that the petition was signed (graduating classes 2010 to 2014) demonstrated their deep disapproval towards Hudson County's decision during the spring of 2010. Many seniors of the Class of 2010 risked their ability to graduate in order to participate in the walk-out that occurred.

Majors
At High Tech, Juniors are required to have 80 minutes of a major per day, and Seniors are required to have 120 minutes (2 hours) of a major per day.

Majors include:
Architecture
Computer-Aided Design and Analysis (CADA)
Automotive Technology
Engineering Technology
Wood Technology
Computer Science
Biomedical Science
Environmental Science
Music and Audio Technology
Dance
Musical Theatre
TV Production
Broadcasting
Studio Arts
Graphic Arts
Culinary Arts

Student Council
The Student Council at High Tech is divided into four smaller student governments, one for each respective class.  At the end of each school year (beginning of the year for the incoming-Freshman class), elections are held to determine the following year's class officers.  The entire class votes, and a simple majority is required to win a position.

Each council consists of elected officials, including the President, Vice President, Secretary, and Treasurer.  The President is responsible for organizing fundraisers and activities to be conducted by the student council.  The Vice President is responsible for assisting the President in fulfilling any and all of their responsibilities, and verifying that class officers stay on task.  The Secretary is responsible for logistics, record keeping, and internal affairs.  The Treasurer is responsible for monitoring all financial activities by the council, and working with the Secretary to keep accurate and available records.

There are two general advisers of the overarching Student Council, and typically two advisers for each individual class government.  There are also a number of student individuals appointed to the council, known as "Liaisons".  These Liaisons are usually evenly distributed throughout academies and majors, and are responsible for delivering information to each of their assigned homerooms and helping execute successful council events and fundraisers.

Notable alumni
 Kyla Garcia, stage, film, and television actress and audiobook narrator.
 Baker Grace, musician and songwriter.

References

External links
High Tech High School website

School Data for the Hudson County Schools of Technology, National Center for Education Statistics
AACT Program website

1991 establishments in New Jersey
Educational institutions established in 1991
Magnet schools in New Jersey
Secaucus, New Jersey
Public high schools in Hudson County, New Jersey